The 2020 Salute to America was an event with flyovers and fireworks arranged by the Trump administration held on Independence Day, July 4, 2020. It was the second event of its kind; the first was held a year prior, in 2019. The 2020 event was especially notable for being held amid the ongoing COVID-19 pandemic and for not requiring masks or social distancing, despite recommendations to do so from the Centers for Disease Control and Prevention and other health officials due to the pandemic. Although masks were handed out free of charge, few of those that attended wore one.

Ten lawmakers had asked President Trump to cancel the event prior to its being held.

It took place primarily at the National Mall, with Trump giving remarks at the South Lawn of the White House at the start of the event.

The fireworks display was created by Fireworks by Grucci.

See also 

 South Dakota's Mount Rushmore Fireworks Celebration 2020 (an event held the night before Salute to America)
 COVID-19 pandemic in Washington, D.C.

References

External links 

 Remarks by President Trump at the 2020 Salute to America at whitehouse.gov

2020 in American politics
2020 in Washington, D.C.
2020 controversies
2020 controversies in the United States
2020 festivals
Articles containing video clips
Events in Washington, D.C.
Independence Day (United States) festivals
July 2020 events in the United States
National Mall
Presidency of Donald Trump
Trump administration controversies